There are forty-five local police agencies in Westchester County, New York. As well as other county, state, and federal agencies responsible for protecting Westchester County, these agencies frequently work with one another and other agencies located in the surrounding counties and states as well as the NYPD. Current economic times has caused a few Westchester municipalities to consider consolidation of police services. The Westchester County Department of Public Safety started providing primary police services for the Town/Village of Mount Kisco in 2015.

Westchester County Department of Public Safety
Westchester County Department of Public Safety was created in 1979 by merging the Westchester County Sheriff's Office with the Westchester County Parkway Police. The current Commissioner/Sheriff is Thomas Gleason.

The department provides primary police coverage for county parks, parkways and facilities. It also patrols the Town of Mount Kisco and supplements the New York State Police in the Town of Cortlandt. The Department is the fourth largest law enforcement agency in Westchester County after the New York State Police, the Department of Corrections and the City of Yonkers Police.

In 2010, County Executive Robert P. Astorino announced a plan to merge the county departments of Public Safety and Emergency Services.  these departments remain separate, and the plan appears to have been abandoned.

 Westchester County District Attorney's Office
 Westchester County Probation Department

Local Police Departments
The following departments are responsible for primary law enforcement in their jurisdictions.

Ardsley Village Police Department
Bedford Town Police Department
Briarcliff Manor Police Department
Bronxville Village Police Department
Buchanan Police Department
Croton-on-Hudson Police Department
Dobbs Ferry Village Police Department
Eastchester Town Police Department
Elmsford Village Police Department
Greenburgh Town Police Department
Harrison Village/Town Police Department
Hastings-on-Hudson Police Department
Irvington Village Police Department
Larchmont Village Police Department
Lewisboro Police Department
Mamaroneck Town Police Department
Mamaroneck Village Police Department
Mount Pleasant Town Police Department
City of Mount Vernon Police Department
New Castle Town Police Department
New Rochelle Police Department
North Castle Town Police Department
North Salem Town Police Department
Ossining Village Police Department
City of Peekskill Police Department
Pelham Manor Police Department
Pelham Village Police Department
Pleasantville Village Police Department
Port Chester Village Police Department
Pound Ridge Town Police Department
Rye Brook Police Department
Town of Rye Police Department
City of Rye Police Department
Scarsdale Village/Town Police Department
Sleepy Hollow Village Police Department
Somers Police Department
Tarrytown Police Department
Tuckahoe Village Police Department
City of White Plains Police Department
City of Yonkers Police Department
Yorktown Town Police Department
Westchester County Police Department

Other Law Enforcement Agencies in Westchester County
 The SPCA of Westchester Humane Law Enforcement has jurisdiction throughout Westchester to enforce Animal Cruelty laws.
New York State Police (has multiple barracks located in Westchester County, responsible for police services in the towns of Cortlandt, Lewisboro, North Salem, Somers and Pound Ridge, on state roads and major thoroughfares such as New York State Thruway, Taconic State Parkway, Interstate 684, Interstate 95 just to name a few as well as supplementing local police agencies with additional resources)
 New York State University Police at Purchase College
New York State Park Police(responsible for patrol and security of all New York State Parks and Sites in Westchester County)
New York State Department of Environmental Conservation Police (NYS DEC Police)
New York City Department of Environmental Protection Police (NYC DEP Police) (Responsible for securing the NYC water supply system in Westchester County - i.e. NYC water shed located in Northern Westchester).
Metropolitan Transportation Authority Police(MTA Police) (Responsible for security and patrol of Metro-North Railroad property).
Amtrak Police
Westchester County Department of Correction 
Westchester County Probation Department
Westchester County District Attorney Investigations Squad
Town of Pelham Constable
Town of Rye Public Safety 
Mamaroneck Village Bay Constable

Bay Constables
The City of Rye and Village of Mamaroneck employs seasonal Bay Constables who serve as Peace Officers.  Constables patrol areas of Long Island Sound and enforce federal, state and local maritime navigation, environmental and fish & wildlife laws.  Bay Constables are armed and have the same powers as New York State Department of Environmental Conservation Police.

Auxiliary Police Officers
Several municipalities in Westchester have Auxiliary Police Units which contains volunteers who are trained Peace Officers and assist their police departments with special events, traffic control, crowd control and patrol. Such Auxiliary units have powers of Peace Officer "only during a period of imminent or actual
attack by enemy forces and during drills authorized under section
twenty-nine-b of article two-B of the executive law, providing for the
use of civil defense forces in disasters" (NYS PL 2.10.26).

Public Safety Emergency Force
The Public Safety Emergency Force (PSEF) is the Volunteer unit within the Westchester County Department of Public Safety. PSEF is composed of part-time Deputy Sheriffs. All members are armed duly sworn peace officers, and possess those powers to carry out their duties per NYS PL 2.10.57a and NYS PL 2.20.

Defunct Law Enforcement Agencies in Westchester County
Ossining Town PD - The Village of Ossining Police provides police services to the unincorporated part of the Town of Ossining as well as the Village of Ossining.
Cortlandt Town PD - disbanded and policed by the New York State Police augmented by the Westchester County Police
Mount Kisco Town/Village PD - disbanded, officers merged with Westchester County Police, Mount Kisco is patrolled by Westchester county Police

See also

List of law enforcement agencies in New York

References

Westchester
Westchester County, New York